Lucien Adolphe Bechmann (25 July 188029 October 1968) is a French architect known for the Fondation Émile et Louise Deutsch de la Meurthe in the Cité internationale universitaire de Paris, the building Washington Plaza, Rue Washington in Paris and the Synagogue Chasseloup-Laubat in Paris.

References 

20th-century French architects
Architectural theoreticians
Order of the Dannebrog
Officiers of the Légion d'honneur
Recipients of the Croix de Guerre 1914–1918 (France)
1880 births
Architects from Paris
1968 deaths